Ronan O'Casey (18 August 1922 – 12 April 2012) was a Canadian actor and producer.

Early life
O'Casey was born in Montreal, Quebec, to poet father, Michael Casey, and actress mother, Margaret Sheehy, a Dubliner who had co-starred with the young James Joyce in his first stage role. At the age of eight Ronan O'Casey began acting in his mother's Montreal theatre company and, after tours in theatre and vaudeville, he moved to Dublin and then to London.

O'Casey was at one time a leading ice hockey player in his native Montreal, skills which he was able to put to use during the filming of children's adventure serial The New Forest Rustlers, in which he played the leader of a gang planning to steal a priceless Rembrandt.

Career
O'Casey found early success in post-war films such as The Mudlark (1950), Talk of a Million (1951) and Norman Wisdom's Trouble in Store (1953), going on to play the prisoner of Room 101 in 1984 and the sergeant in Nicholas Ray's war film Bitter Victory (1957). While starring in the West End play Detective Story he met actress and singer Louie Ramsay, whom he married in 1956.

O'Casey's comedy talents brought him his best known role, as Jeff Rogers, Canadian son-in-law of Peggy Mount, in the TV sitcom The Larkins (1958–64). He was host of ITV's charades gameshow Don't Say a Word (1963), a panel game with two teams led by Libby Morris and Kenneth Connor. and co-host of Rediffusion's Sing A Song of Sixpence show. In 1966 he was cast as Vanessa Redgrave's lover, the "blow-up" of Antonioni's Blow-Up (1966).

O'Casey also appeared on stage, in plays such as Forever April at the Nottingham Playhouse, in which he co-starred with Kenneth Connor in 1966. and Eugene O'Neill's Desire Under the Elms at London's Embassy Theatre in 1955.

As literary head of the production company Commonwealth United, O'Casey was an associate producer on Terry Southern's The Magic Christian (1969) with Ringo Starr, Peter Sellers and a soundtrack by Badfinger. 
O'Casey was divorced from Louie Ramsay in 1979, and, after moving to the United States in 1980, he married the writer Carol Tavris. He had roles in many US television shows, including L.A. Law, Easy Street, Falcon Crest and Dallas and Santa Barbara.
In later years he wrote and staged a one-man play in Los Angeles on the poetry of Yeats by O'Casey.

Stage

Filmography

Film

TV

References

External links
 Ronan O'Casey at the BFI

1922 births
2012 deaths
Canadian male film actors
Canadian male stage actors
Canadian male television actors
Male actors from Montreal
Canadian people of Irish descent
Canadian emigrants to the United States
Canadian expatriates in Ireland
Canadian expatriates in the United Kingdom